In mathematics, particularly in the field of differential topology, the preimage theorem is a variation of the implicit function theorem concerning the preimage of particular points in a manifold under the action of a smooth map.

Statement of Theorem

Definition. Let  be a smooth map between manifolds. We say that a point  is a regular value of  if for all  the map  is surjective.

Theorem.

There is also a complex version of this theorem:

Theorem.

See also

References

Theorems in differential topology